Gary Gomez (born September 25, 1974) is an American former professional boxer who competed from 2001 to 2011. On December 4, 2005 he won the WBC Continental Americas cruiserweight title, defeating the undefeated champion Chad Van Sickle. He lost the title to  Charles Davis on July 21 of the next year.

In April 2005 he was ranked as the 20th cruiserweight, and was the only national titleholder from Utah.

Professional record

|- style="margin:0.5em auto; font-size:95%;"
|align="center" colspan=8|19 Wins (7 knockouts), 13 Losses (1 knockouts), 2 Draw
|- style="margin:0.5em auto; font-size:95%;"
|align=center style="border-style: none none solid solid; background: #e3e3e3"|Res.
|align=center style="border-style: none none solid solid; background: #e3e3e3"|Record
|align=center style="border-style: none none solid solid; background: #e3e3e3"|Opponent
|align=center style="border-style: none none solid solid; background: #e3e3e3"|Type
|align=center style="border-style: none none solid solid; background: #e3e3e3"|Rd., Time
|align=center style="border-style: none none solid solid; background: #e3e3e3"|Date
|align=center style="border-style: none none solid solid; background: #e3e3e3"|Location
|align=center style="border-style: none none solid solid; background: #e3e3e3"|Notes
|-align=center
|Loss ||19–13–1 ||align=left| Andres Taylor
|UD || 8 || 2011-11-23|| align=left| Stage AE, Pittsburgh, Pennsylvania, U.S.
|align=left|
|-align=center
|Loss ||19–12–1 ||align=left| Jonte Willis
|UD || 7 || 2011-08-12|| align=left| Silver Reef Casino, Ferndale, Washington, U.S.
|align=left|
|-align=center
|Win ||19–11–2 ||align=left| Valente Tinajero
|UD || 8 || 2010-12-04|| align=left| Golden Spike Coliseum, Ogden, Utah, U.S.
|align=left|Won vacant USA Utah State cruiserweight title
|-align=center
|Draw ||18–11–2 ||align=left| Mike Mollo
|MD || 8 ||2010-08-06|| align=left| UIC Pavilion, Chicago, Illinois, U.S.
|align=left|
|-align=center
|Loss ||18–11–1 ||align=left| Ran Nakash
|UD || 8 || 2009-10-02|| align=left| The Blue Horizon, Philadelphia, Pennsylvania, U.S.
|align=left|
|-align=center
|Loss || 18–10–1 ||align=left| Tomasz Adamek 
|RTD || 7 (10),  || 2008-07-11 || align=left| Aragon Ballroom, Chicago, Illinois, U.S.
|align=left|
|-align=center
|Loss || 18–9–1 ||align=left| Jeremy Williams
|SD || 8 || 2007-08-18 || align=left| Sandy, Utah, U.S.
|align=left|
|-align=center
|Loss || 14–5 ||align=left|  Charles Davis
|UD || 10 || 2005-07-21 || align=left| Madison Square Garden, New York, New York, U.S.
|align=left|Lost WBC Continental Americas cruiserweight title
|-align=center
|Win|| 13–4 ||align=left| Chad Van Sickle
|MD || 10 || 2004-12-04 || align=left| Emerald Queen Casino, Tacoma, Washington, U.S.
|align=left|Won WBC Continental Americas cruiserweight title
|-align=center
|Win|| 10–3 ||align=left| Michael Sams
|TKO || 6 (10),  || 2004-03-27 || align=left| Swinomish Northern Lights Casino, Anacortes, Washington, U.S.
|align=left|Won  cruiserweight title
|-align=center
|Loss || 3–1 ||align=left| Felix Cora Jr.
|UD || 8 || 2002-06-27 || align=left| Santa Ana Star Casino, Bernalillo, New Mexico, U.S.
|align=left|
|-align=center
|Win || 3–0 ||align=left| Behnam Shahvandi
|PTS || 4 || 2001-11-25 || align=left| Stateline Casino, West Wendover, Nevada, U.S.
|align=left|
|-align=center
|Win || 2–0 ||align=left| Derrick Johnson
|TKO || 3 || 2001-10-20 || align=left| West Wendover, Nevada, U.S.
|align=left|
|-align=center
|Win || 1–0 ||align=left| Marcio Castillo
|TKO || 2 (4),  || 2001-09-23 || align=left| Stateline Casino, West Wendover, Nevada, U.S.
|align=left|

References

External links
 

Living people
1974 births
American male boxers
Cruiserweight boxers
Boxers from Montana
Sportspeople from Butte, Montana